Epistulae ad Quintum Fratrem (Letters to brother Quintus) is a collection of letters from Roman politician and orator Marcus Tullius Cicero to his younger brother Quintus.

The letters in this collection, when combined with Cicero's other letters, are considered the most reliable sources of information for the period leading up to the fall of the Roman Republic. His letters to Quintus share a similar quality to those sent to his close friend Titus Pomponius Atticus, written with a freedom and frankness not to be found in his correspondence with others. Traditionally spanning 3 books, and featuring letters from 60 or 59 to 54 BCE, this collection may have been first published by Cicero's freedman and personal secretary Marcus Tullius Tiro sometime after the deaths of both brothers in 43 BCE.

References

External links
 
 Cicero, letters to his friends: volume 3. Including the letters to Quintus and to Brutus, translated  by William Glynn Williams, (1927), Loeb Classical Library, at the Internet Archive

1st-century BC Latin books
Collections of letters
Works by Cicero